Bremond Independent School District is a public school district based in Bremond, Texas (USA). The district operates one high school, Bremond High School.

Finances
As of the 2010–2011 school year, the appraised valuation of property in the district was $403,424,000. The maintenance tax rate was $0.104 and the bond tax rate was $0.025 per $100 of appraised valuation.

Academic achievement
In 2011, the school district was rated "recognized" by the Texas Education Agency.  Thirty-five percent of districts in Texas in 2011 received the same rating. No state accountability ratings will be given to districts in 2012. A school district in Texas can receive one of four possible rankings from the Texas Education Agency: Exemplary (the highest possible ranking), Recognized, Academically Acceptable, and Academically Unacceptable (the lowest possible ranking).

Historical district TEA accountability ratings
 2011: Recognized
 2010: Recognized
 2009: Recognized
 2008: Academically Acceptable
 2007: Academically Acceptable
 2006: Academically Acceptable
 2005: Recognized
 2004: Recognized

Schools
In the 2011–2012 school year, the district operated three schools.
 Bremond High School (Grades 9–12)
 Bremond Middle School (Grades 6–8)
 Bremond Elementary School (Grades PK–5)

Athletics 

Bremond High School participates in the boys sports of baseball, basketball, football and track. The school participates in the girls sports of basketball, softball, volleyball and track. For the 2016 through 2018 school years, Bremond High School will play football in UIL Class 2A Division II. During the 2014 football season, the Bremond football team won the 2A Division II state championship with a record of 15–0. In the 2015 Football season the Tigers beat Albany the second time in a row to finish the season undefeated 16–0 back to back state champions. In 2016 the Tigers yet again finished 16-0 and won their third straight state title over Iraan finishing with a 47–0 record in the last 3 seasons. Star quarterback Roshauud Paul now plays wide receiver for Texas A&M.

See also

 List of school districts in Texas
 List of high schools in Texas

References

External links
 Bremond ISD

School districts in Robertson County, Texas
School districts in Falls County, Texas